Sebastián Cancelliere (born 17 September 1993) is an Argentina international rugby union player.

Rugby Union career

Amateur career

Cancelliere learned all his rugby in Argentina; he is a product of Hindú club in Buenos Aires.

Professional career

Earlier in 2019 Cancelliere played Super Rugby for Jaguares. He was a part of the roster which reached the 2019 Super Rugby Final.

He joined Glasgow Warriors for the 2021–22 season. He made his competitive debut for the Glasgow club playing in the United Rugby Championship against Zebre at the Stadio Sergio Lanfranchi in Parma. He became Glasgow Warrior No. 336.

International career

Prior to Super Rugby, Cancelliere was involved for the Argentina XV. He played at both scrum-half and wing for the national next-of-XV.

He made his test debut against England in 2017. He was considered for Rugby World Cup 2019. He played in Argentina's final warm-up match against South Africa.

References

External links
 itsrugby Profile

Jaguares (Super Rugby) players
Rugby union wings
Argentine rugby union players
1993 births
Living people
Hindú Club players
Argentina international rugby union players
Glasgow Warriors players